A tephigram is one of four thermodynamic diagrams commonly used in weather analysis and forecasting. The name evolved from the original name "T--gram" to describe the axes of temperature (T) and entropy used to create the plot. Usually, temperature and dew point data from radiosondes are plotted on these diagrams to allow calculations of convective stability or convective available potential energy (CAPE). Wind barbs are often plotted at the side of a tephigram to indicate the winds at different heights.

Description 

The tephigram was invented by Napier Shaw in 1915 and is used primarily in the United Kingdom and Canada. Other countries use similar thermodynamic diagrams for the same purpose however the details of their construction vary. In the tephigram, isotherms are straight and have a 45 degree inclination to the right while isobars are horizontal and have a slight curve. Dry adiabats are also straight and have a 45 degree inclination to the left while moist adiabats are curved.

The main reason that tephigrams are used by the British Met Office, the  Meteorological Service of Canada, and Met Éireann (Irish Meteorological Service) is the property that areas contained by the curves have equal energies for equal areas, leading to better comparisons of CAPE and hence convective systems.

See also
 Thermodynamic diagrams
 Skew-T log-P diagram, a variation of the Emagram
 Stüve diagram

References

Bibliography
 M.H.P. Ambaum, Thermal Physics of the Atmosphere, published by Wiley-Blackwell, April 16, 2010, 240 pages.  
 R.R. Rogers and M.K. Yau, Short Course in Cloud Physics, Third Edition, published by Butterworth-Heinemann, January 1, 1989, 304 pages.  
 J.V. Iribarne and W.L. Godson, Atmospheric Thermodynamics, 2nd Edition, published by D. Reidel Publishing Company, Dordrecht, Netherlands, 1981, 278 pages,

External links
 Department of Meteorology, University of Reading page about tephigrams including pdfs of blank printable colour and monochrome tephigrams.

Atmospheric thermodynamics